The Phantom Hour is a 2016 comedy horror short film written and directed by Brian Patrick Butler. It premiered September 8, 2016 at Horrible Imaginings Film Festival. The film is an homage to German expressionist silent films.

Plot 
In a mysterious location, a vampire and his chef have a surprise for their dinner guests.

Cast 
 Luke Anthony Pensabene as Nikolai
 Raye Richards as Anna
 Connor Riley Sullivan as Jeff
 Morgan K. Reynolds as Denise
 Dakota Ringer as Bernardo
 Brian Patrick Butler as Bryce

Release 

The Phantom Hour held a screening at Horrible Imaginings Film Festival on September 8, 2016. On February 17, 2017 it was shown at San Diego Film Week. The film went on to The International Horror Hotel in Cleveland on June 17, 2017.

Reception 
Brian Shaer at Film Threat scored it 7 out of 10, calling it a "chuckle-worthy diversion" and a "painless and fun experiment". Both Melee Stormbringer of Horror News Net and Ben Ragunton of Two Gay Geeks found it funny, comparing the film to Murder by Death and Clue. Emilie Black of Cinema Crazed said "it’s campy, it’s funny, it’s a bit ridiculous" and compared Butler's character to Renfield. Robert Mitchell Evans stated that it has a "lovely retro feel complete with a classic 30’s style of credits and paid homage to classic tropes".

References

External links 
 
 

2016 films
2016 comedy films
2016 short films
2010s comedy horror films
2010s parody films
American black comedy films
American comedy horror films
American parody films
American horror short films
American vampire films
Films directed by Brian Patrick Butler
German Expressionist films
2010s English-language films
2010s American films
Films about chefs
Parodies of horror
Films released on YouTube